Johan Herman Bavinck (22 November 1895 – 23 June 1964) was a Dutch pastor, missionary and theologian.

Family
Bavinck was born in Rotterdam as the second son of Reverend Coenraad Bernardus Bavinck. He attended the Marnix Gymnasium there. Both his father and his grandfather Jan Bavinck were pastors. His uncle was Herman Bavinck, pastor and Professor of Dogmatics at the theological school in Kampen and at the Vrije Universiteit in Amsterdam. In 1922 Bavinck married Tine Robers. Their children were Koert, Ben and Ineke.

Study and Ministry
After his secondary education he went to study theology at the Vrije Universiteit in Amsterdam. After this study he moved to Germany to continue his study in Gießen and Erlangen. In 1919 he graduated from Erlangen having completed a dissertation on psychology and mysticism in the work of Heinrich von Suso. In 1920, he began his work as pastor of a church in the Gereformeerde Kerken in Nederland. He became pastor in Medan and the next year in the congregation in Bandoeng, both in Indonesia. Both churches were focused on the Dutch population. During a furlough he decided to stay in the Netherlands, and in 1927 he became pastor in Heemstede. In January 1930, he departed again to Indonesia, after many months of preparation, to be a missionary pastor. He settled in Surakarta and worked from 1934 to 1939 as a teacher on the Seminary for Javanese Ministers in Yogyakarta. In 1939, he became in a professor at the Vrije Universiteit in Amsterdam. At the same time he was from 1939 till 1954 Professor of Missions at the Kampen Theological Seminary. In 1954 he was appointed Professor of Practical Theology at Vrije Universiteit in Amsterdam. Because of this assignment he had to end his work in Kampen. Among his contributions to the theology of missions, are his views on elenctics.

Publications
 Der Einfluss des Gefulhs auf das Assoziationsleben bei Heinrich von Suso - Erlangen 1919
 Inleiding in de zielkunde - Kampen 1926
 Christus en de mystiek van het oosten - Kampen 1934
 De boodschap van Christus en de niet-christelijke religies. Een analyse en beoordeling van het boek van dr. Kraemer: The Christian message in a non-Christian world - Kampen 1940
 The impact of Christianity on the non-Christian world - Grand Rapids 1948
 Religieus besef en het christelijk geloof - Kampen 1949
 Inleiding in de zendingswetenschap - Kampen 1954; translated as An Introduction to the Science of Missions - 1960
 The Church Between Temple and Mosque – A Study of the Relationship Between the Christian Faith and Other Religions - Grand Rapids 1966

References

Missiologists

Dutch Calvinist and Reformed theologians
20th-century Calvinist and Reformed theologians
Dutch Protestant missionaries
20th-century Dutch Calvinist and Reformed ministers
Clergy from Rotterdam
1895 births
1964 deaths
Vrije Universiteit Amsterdam alumni
Protestant missionaries in Indonesia
World Christianity scholars